Vanikoro gueriniana is a species of very small sea snail, a marine gastropod mollusk in the family Vanikoridae.

Description

Distribution
This marine species occurs in the Red Sea and in the Mascarene Basin.

References

 Bosch D.T., Dance S.P., Moolenbeek R.G. & Oliver P.G. (1995) Seashells of eastern Arabia. Dubai: Motivate Publishing. 296 pp.

External links
 

Vanikoridae
Gastropods described in 1845